NESSUS is a general-purpose, probabilistic analysis program that simulates variations and uncertainties in loads, geometry, material behavior and other user-defined inputs to compute probability of failure and probabilistic sensitivity measures of engineered systems. Because NESSUS uses highly efficient and accurate probabilistic analysis methods, probabilistic solutions can be obtained even for extremely large and complex models. The system performance can be hierarchically decomposed into multiple smaller models and/or analytical equations. Once the probabilistic response is quantified, the results can be used to support risk-informed decisions regarding reliability for safety critical and one-of-a-kind systems, and to maintain a level of quality while reducing manufacturing costs for larger quantity products.

NESSUS is interfaced to all major commercial finite element programs and includes capabilities for analyzing computationally intensive real-world problems.  It has been successfully applied to a diverse range of problems in aerospace, gas turbine engines, biomechanics, pipelines, defense, weaponry and infrastructure.

Project history 

NESSUS was originally developed by a team led by Southwest Research Institute (SwRI) as part of a 10-year NASA project to develop a probabilistic design tool for the Space Shuttle main engine.

In 1999, SwRI was contracted by Los Alamos National Laboratory (LANL) to adapt NESSUS for application to extremely large and complex weapon reliability problems in support of its Stockpile Stewardship program.

In 2002, SwRI was contracted by the NASA Glenn Research Center to further enhance NESSUS for application to large-scale, aero-propulsion system problems.

The end result of these two large programs was a completely redesigned software tool — NESSUS Version 8.2 — that includes
a graphical user interface, three-dimensional probability contouring and results visualization, capabilities for performing advanced design of experiments and sensitivity analysis, a probabilistic input database, and interfaces to many new third-party codes such as ABAQUS, ANSYS, LS-DYNA, MSC.NASTRAN and ParaDyn.

Applications 

NESSUS can compute the probabilistic response or reliability of virtually any engineered system where mathematical models can be developed to describe the performance of the system. NESSUS has been applied to a diverse range of problems including aerospace structures, automotive structures, biomechanics, gas turbine engines, geomechanics, nuclear waste packaging, offshore structures, pipelines and rotordynamics.

Recent specific applications of NESSUS include:

 Aircraft Control Lever Fatigue
 Automotive Crankshaft High-Cycle Fatigue
 Cervical Spine Impact Injury
 Tunnel Vulnerability Assessment
 Orthopaedic Implant Cement Loosening
 Stochastic Crashworthiness in Head-on Impact
 Nuclear Weapon System Verification and Validation
 Pipeline Reliability Assessment
 Space Shuttle Main Engine Flow Line

See also 
 Fast probability integration

External links 
 Laboratory captures four R&D Awards
  Probabilistic engineering analysis using the NESSUS software (Structural Safety, Vol. 28, Issues 1-2, Jan-Apr 2006)
 Structural Analysis Made 'NESSUSary' (NASA Spinoff  2005)
 "Running the Numbers", from Technology Today, Summer 2005
 NESSUS home page

Probabilistic software